Altun Jan Khatun (died December 1060) was the principal consort of Sultan Tughril, the founder of the Seljuk Empire, ruling from 1037 to 1063.

Early life
Altun Jan Khatun was a Turkish woman, possibly from Khwarazm. Before becoming Tughril Beg's wife she had been married to the Khwarazm Shah Shah Malik. Her son by that marriage, Anushirwan, apparently remained with her after she married Tughril Beg in around 1043.

Political influence
Tughril Beg is reported to have consulted his chief wife Altun Jan Khatun in affairs, Sibt ibn al-Jawzi states that she was a religious woman, much given to charitable works, of good judgement and firm determination. 

When Tughril Beg went to Hamadan in 1058 to deal with the revolt of Ibrahim Inal, he sent Altun Jan, Anushirwan and al-Kunduri to Baghdad. Despite the Caliph's objection, Altun Jan went to join her husband at Hamadan, taking the treasury and Seljuk soldiery in Baghdad with her, leaving al-Kanduri. When Ibrahim Inal learnt of Altun Jan's approach he seems to have sent a force to have her intercepted. Other Turkmen joined Tughril Beg's forces, and defeated Ibrahim Inal. After this Tughril retired to Rey, where Altun Jan joined him. 

In Tughril's last days, before al-Basasiri's seizure of the city, a convoluted plot had been hatched by Altun Jan Khatun and his vizier al-Kunduri to install Altun Jan's son, Anushirwan. However, Anushirwan attracted no support, and Altun Jan soon dissociated herself from the plot, all of whose conspirators appear to have been eventually restored to favor without further punishment.

Death and aftermath
She died of edema in December 1060 in Zanjan. Tughril grieved for her greatly, and her bier was carried to Rey, where she was buried. She held estates in Iran. Just before her death she bequeathed her states, assignments and  pensions to the Caliph's daughter Seyyedeh Fatima. Tughril assigned these to the latter when the marriage contract between him and the caliph's daughter was finally concluded in 1062. According to some sources it was her who requested Tughril to marry the caliph's daughter at her deathbed. After Tughril's death in 1063, Anushirwan rebelled but was captured. He was imprisoned in Rey and was killed.

References

Sources

1060 deaths
11th-century Turkic women
Seljuk Empire
Women in 11th-century warfare